Events from the year 1726 in Sweden

Incumbents
 Monarch – Frederick I

Events

 12 January - Conventicle Act (Sweden)
 26 October - Women are formally allowed employment at the Kungliga Hovkapellet, the first officially employed females being Judith Fischer and Sophia Schröder. 
 - Johann Konrad Dippel visit Sweden, after which Radical Pietism spreads rapidly. 
 - The first Steam engine created in Sweden. 
 - The Ulrika Eleonora Stålhammar case.

Births

 
 

 11 February - Margaretha Donner, business person  (died 1774)

Deaths

References

 
Years of the 18th century in Sweden
Sweden